Digital Island is a business-to-business telecommunications provider based at 8 Nugent Street in Grafton, Auckland, New Zealand.

It was sold to Spark Ventures in November 2017, and continues to operate as a brand. Spark Ventures was merged to be part of the general Spark New Zealand brand in 2019

Services

Digital Island is a specialist business Telco providing a complete bundle of services to medium and large businesses and not for profit organisations in New Zealand. Digital Island's services include Cloud PBX (based on Mitel's Telepo and MICD carrier voice & messaging solutions), Fibre Internet Access (via Chorus UFB & other), Mobile services (MVNO) and traditional POTS services such as business lines and tollfree services.

Awards

Digital Island is the winner of the Deloitte Fast 50 awards for "Fastest growing technology company" in 2008, and "Fastest growing telecommunications business" in 2007, Digital Island also placed overall for 3 consecutive years in 2007, 2008, and 2009, and placed in the Vero Excellence in Business Awards in 2010.

History

Digital Island started operations in 2003 by 3 New Zealanders who having recently returned from the UK, saw a gap in the market for a dedicated B2B voice/internet provider.

References

External links
 
 Telepo by Digital Island

Telecommunications companies of New Zealand
New Zealand companies established in 2003
Telecommunications companies established in 2003
Companies based in Auckland